Micah Nathan is an American author of novels, short fiction, essays, and video games. His debut novel, Gods of Aberdeen, was published in 2005 by Simon & Schuster to critical acclaim, and his second novel, Losing Graceland, published by Broadway Books in 2011, also received positive reviews, called "a blend of the ironic and the painfully sincere" by the Washington Post, while the Boston Globe referred to its "low-rent variations on a Homeric theme, antic originality, and the near-magic realism of Elvis as a geriatric Ulysses."

In 2012 Nathan published Jack the Bastard and Other Stories, a short story collection with illustrations by Russ Nicholson, Phil Noto, Tradd Moore, and Michael Allred. Fat Possum Records released a limited edition soundtrack for the book, featuring tracks by The Black Keys and Townes Van Zandt. Nathan has worked as a creative consultant and head writer for several best-selling mobile games, including Shadowgun and Dead Trigger.

Nathan is a contributor to Vanity Fair, where he has written about Andy Warhol, Marilyn Monroe, Alan Rickman, River Phoenix, and James Spader (whom he has referred to as "...one of the more underrated actors of his generation, despite all the better-late-than-never accolades.").

Nathan's essays and short fiction have appeared in The Paris Review, Kinfolk, The Best American Mystery Stories, Boston Globe Magazine, Post Road, Bellingham Review, Glimmer Train, The Gettysburg Review, and Commonweal. During his time as fiction editor for LEMON Magazine, the publication won a 2013 D&AD Award. He received his MFA from Boston University, where he was awarded the 2010 Saul Bellow Prize. Nathan has taught at the Museum School, Boston University, Kingston University (UK), and is currently a lecturer at the Massachusetts Institute of Technology.

References

External links
 
 Simon & Schuster author page
 Random House author page
 
 Vanity Fair page
 MIT page

1973 births
Writers from Los Angeles
Living people
American male novelists
American male short story writers
American male essayists
21st-century American novelists
21st-century American short story writers
21st-century American essayists
21st-century American male writers